K. Raghupati Bhat (born 24 February 1969) is an Indian politician and a member of the Karnataka Legislative Assembly representing the constituency of Udupi.

Political career
After delimitation exercise carried out in the year 2008  by Election commission of India, The Udupi assembly constituency number has changed to 120. He was member of Thirteenth Karnataka Legislative Assembly from 30 May 2008 to 5 May 2013  representing Udupi constituency.   He is now member of Fifteenth Karnataka Legislative Assembly (M.L.A) from Udupi.He belongs to Bharatiya Janata Party (BJP). He started as a member of BJP. He was elected to Udupi municipal council and he was also the president of district BJP Yuva morcha (Youth wing).

References

External links
K Raghupathi Bhat, Official Webpage
 K.Raghupathi Bhat

1969 births
Living people
People from Udupi
Mangaloreans
Tulu people
Bharatiya Janata Party politicians from Karnataka
Karnataka MLAs 2004–2007
Karnataka MLAs 2008–2013
Karnataka MLAs 2018–2023